The 1906 International Cross Country Championships was held in Caerleon, Wales, at the Caerleon Racecourse on 10 March 1906. 
A report on the event was given in the Glasgow Herald.

Complete results, medallists, 
 and the results of British athletes were published.

Medallists

Individual race results

Men's (10 mi / 16.1km)

Team results

Men's

Participation
An unofficial count yields the participation of 44 athletes from 4 countries.

 (12)
 (8)
 (12)
 (12)

See also
 1906 in athletics (track and field)

References

International Cross Country Championships
International Cross Country Championships
International Cross Country Championships
International Cross Country Championships
International Cross Country Championships, Caerleon
Athletics races in Newport
International athletics competitions hosted by Wales
Cross country running in the United Kingdom